Hebei Subdistrict is a subdistrict in Yucheng District, Ya'an, Sichuan province, China. , it has five residential communities and two villages under its administration.
Tingjin Road Community
Nan'er Road Community
Kangzang Road Community
Doudan Community
Shaxi Community
Hongxing Village
Lianping Village

See also 
 List of township-level divisions of Sichuan

References 

Township-level divisions of Sichuan
Ya'an